Ethmia mixtella is a moth in the family Depressariidae. It is found in North Africa.

References

Moths described in 1915
mixtella